Elachyophtalma picaria is a moth in the family Bombycidae. It was described by Francis Walker in 1865. It is found on New Guinea.

References

Bombycidae
Moths described in 1865